Van Nu en Straks (Of Now and Later or Today and Tomorrow) was a Flemish literary and cultural magazine that was founded in 1893 by August Vermeylen. With a cover designed by Henry van de Velde, this magazine served as a vehicle for a Flemish literary revival and was associated with a heterogeneous group of writers and artists. They were devoted to art for art's sake, without holding dogmatic views on aesthetics or adherence to schools of art. The magazine was published in two series: from 1893–94 and from 1896–1901. It was succeeded in 1903 by the illustrated magazine Vlaanderen, which was co-founded by Herman Teirlinck.

See also
 Cyriel Buysse

References

1893 establishments in Belgium
1901 disestablishments in Belgium
Magazines published in Belgium
Defunct literary magazines published in Europe
Defunct magazines published in Belgium
Dutch-language magazines
Magazines published in Flanders
Magazines established in 1893
Magazines disestablished in 1901